Riom-ès-Montagnes (Occitan: Riòm de las Montanhas) is a commune in the Cantal department in south-central France.

Geography

Location 
Main town of the "Pays Gentiane", the city is located northwest of the department of Cantal, in the heart of the regional natural park of Auvergne Volcanoes.

Located between the Monts Dore and the Mounts of Cantal at an altitude of 840 meters, Riom-ès-Montagnes accounts 2 591 inhabitants.

Hydrography 
The Véronne river crosses Riom-ès-Montagnes. It flows into Petite Rhue, which marks the boundary between Riom-ès-Montagnes and the neighboring towns of Marchastel and Saint-Amandin.

The dam of Journiac is partly on the town, on the Petite Rhue at the limit with Saint-Amandin.

Other rivers crisscross the town as the brook of Grolle, the brook of Cheylat, the Soulou...

Climate 
The climate is a mountain climate where there is a frequent presence of frost and snow in winter and in the summer days can be hot and sunny followed by cooler nights. Spring and autumn are characterized by an abundance of rainy days and the frequent presence of fog.

Transports 
Once very used, rail transport is still active thanks to the Gentian express, touristic train that circulates in Haute-Auvergne, stops in Riom-ès-Montagnes station and partially takes the old line of Bort-les-Orgues to Neussargues . This line was inaugurated on July 5, 1908.

Louis Bonnet, creator of the "Auvergnat de Paris" was a forerunner in what is nowadays called "organized trips". In 1904, he created the trains that bear his name. Until 1939, they drove, at a reduced price, every spring and summer, compatriots in the country. A special atmosphere prevails in these wagons, as it should be between Auvergnats: Cabrette and snack, Bourrée on the platform at each stop. These trips will pass to Riom-ès-Montagnes in 1923.

Two axes intersect in the city, the axis Mauriac / Condat and the axis Bort-les-Orgues / Murat / Saint-Flour.

The national road 678 which went from Laguenne to La Sauvetat, through Mauriac, Riom-ès-Montagnes and Condat  is downgraded to "departmental road 678" on the department of Cantal.

Toponymy 
The name originates from Gallic “rigomagos” meaning the king's market. From the Gallic word Rix or rig, the local "king", the one who probably perceived the market rights, accompanied by the Gallic word magos. The Gallic word “magos” first designated a field, then a fairground, a market and finally the village or city that develops around this market.

History 
Its creation dates back to the ancient Gallo-Roman era as evidenced by the very name of the city, the Gaulish "rigomagos" meaning the king's market.

 • February 1790: the Arbres and Châteauneuf are erected in common but are attached to Riom in 1836
 • 1836: the municipality of Riom changes its name to Riom-ès-Montagnes.
 • June 7, 1908: electrification of the town by Mr. Gratacap, engineer at Maurs
 • May 26, 1912: First tourist guide of the city
 • February 1920: creation of an initiative syndicate
 • 1924: revival of fairs thanks to the railway. The most famous is that of St. Michael.
 • 1925: industrial production of Auvergne Gentiane by Émile Refouvelet, ancestor of the Avèze.
 • 1938: the extension of the city causes problems of water supply and makes it necessary to give names to the streets.
 • May 30, 1970: creation of the Haut Cantal clinic. Currently rest home and postoperative care.
 • 1998: Creation of the Geneviève Champsaur center (reception of patients suffering from multiple sclerosis)
 • 2006: creation of a home and care facility for Alzheimer's
 • 2009: creation of a functional rehabilitation center for the rehabilitation of respiratory patients.

Population and Society

Demography

Cultural events and celebrations 
In 2015, the municipality had 2,591 inhabitants, down 3.97% compared to 2010 (Cantal: -1.31%, France excluding Mayotte: + 2.44%).

Cultural Manifesations:

• Rally Gentiane, May

• Green Axis Festival, May

• Patronal Feast, 3rd weekend of June

• Festival Between Heaven and Earth, July

• Feast of gentian, July

• Book Fair, August

• Fête de la Rosière, weekend of August 15

• Festival of Bleu d'Auvergne, penultimate weekend of August

• Mycological days in Haute-Auvergne, October

• Christmas market, December

The Community of Communes of the Gentian Country, the Cultural Office of the Gentian Country, the Tourist Office of the Pays Gentiane, the municipal library and the community in general also organize several cultural events from September to June (concerts, theater, dance, exhibitions, sports competitions ...).

Economy 
The service sector employed 1335 people in 2012. Healthcare is the biggest employment sector (around 450 people). The town accounts above 100 merchants and artisans and the central administration employs around 100 people as well (Post office, Public Finance...)

Agriculture 
Riom has about fifty farmers. Cattle breeding of the local Salers breed plays an important role.

Agri-food Sector 
The production of Cantal and Bleu d'Auvergne is the main activity of the agri-food sector. The Riom Cheese Company is the leading company in this field which employs 180 people. More than half of Bleu d'Auvergne's production comes from Riom. The first dairy was opened in 1900 by Charles Seroude and from 1949 to 1958, The Laughing Cow will be manufactured there. The plant has about 1,000 farmers in the CFCU.

A brand of Gentiana Liquor, Avèze is produced locally and employs a few people.

Chemviron, has one of the three diatomite processing sites in France in Riom. This one is extracted from a quarry located on the territory of the commune of Virargues. The company of diatomites was created in 1923. In 1949, new development of this plant with its purchase by the ECSC. The company employs around fifty people in Riom.

See also

Communes of the Cantal department

References

Communes of Cantal
Auvergne
Cantal communes articles needing translation from French Wikipedia